Leo Marfurt (1894–1977) was a Swiss-Belgian commercial artist, best known for his posters of the 1930s, in an innovative Art Deco style that sometimes incorporated elements of Futurism, Cubism and Surrealism.

Life
Marfurt was born in Aarau, Switzerland, in 1894. He moved to Belgium in 1921, marrying there in 1922.

In 1927 Marfurt set up his own business in Brussels under the name Les Créations Publicitaires ("Advertising Creations"). His customers included the Brussels World Fairs of 1935 and 1958, Minerva automobiles, Chrysler, Belga cigarettes, cross-channel ferries, and railways in both Belgium and the United Kingdom.

He died in Antwerp in 1977.

Exhibitions
An exhibition of Leo Marfurt's posters advertising gins and liqueurs was held in the Nationaal Jenevermuseum, Hasselt, from January to May 2002.

References

External links
 Marfurt posters in the Royal Museums of Fine Arts of Belgium. Accessed 24 December 2015.

1894 births
1977 deaths
Swiss poster artists
Belgian poster artists
People from Aarau
Swiss emigrants to Belgium